Čerín is a village and municipality of the Banská Bystrica District in the Banská Bystrica Region of central Slovakia.

History
In historical records, the village was first mentioned in 1300 (as Cheren), when it belonged to a certain Paul, brother of Demeter, count of Zvolen. The village later belonged to the town of Zvolen and to the castle of Vígľaš. In the 16th century, it had to pay tributes to the Ottoman Empire.

References

External links
 Basic information about Čerín

Villages and municipalities in Banská Bystrica District